is a train station on the Hankyu Railway Kyoto Line located in Shimamoto, Mishima District, Osaka Prefecture, Japan, along the Tōkaidō Shinkansen between Kyōto and Shin-Ōsaka Stations.

Lines
Hankyu Railway
Kyōto Main Line

Layout
There are two side platforms with two tracks elevated.

History 
Minase Station opened on 16 May 1939.

Station numbering was introduced to all Hankyu stations on 21 December 2013 with this station being designated as station number HK-74.

References

External links
Station website  

Hankyu Kyoto Main Line
Railway stations in Osaka Prefecture
Railway stations in Japan opened in 1939